is a professional Go player.

Biography
Yoshio became a professional in 1985. He was promoted to 8 dan in 2003. He reached 400 career wins in 2003. He has three pupils, Takei Takashi, Yasuo Sakamoto and Yuri Tanemurasa. He is the head of the Kansai branch of the Nihon Ki-in.

Promotion record

References

External links
 Nihon Ki-in profile 

1969 births
Japanese Go players
Living people
People from Osaka